Heino Holm Knudsen (born 28 January 1979) is a Danish left back handballer playing for the Danish league club Viborg HK, where he arrived from league rivals, Team Tvis Holstebro. He has also played for also league rivals Århus GF and AaB Håndbold.

References
 Player info 

Danish male handball players
1979 births
Living people
Viborg HK players
Aalborg Håndbold players
Place of birth missing (living people)
21st-century Danish people